Celebrity Big Brother 2013 may refer to one of two series of Celebrity Big Brother UK which aired in 2013:

Celebrity Big Brother 11, January series
Celebrity Big Brother 12, August-September series